Val-Fouzon is a commune in the Indre department of central France. The municipality was established on 1 January 2016 by merger of the former communes of Varennes-sur-Fouzon, Parpeçay and Sainte-Cécile.

See also 
Communes of the Indre department

References 

Communes of Indre